Grip Stave Church is a historic parish church of the Church of Norway in Kristiansund Municipality in Møre og Romsdal county, Norway. It is an annex church for the Kristiansund parish which is part of the Ytre Nordmøre prosti (deanery) in the Diocese of Møre. The white, wooden church was built in a rectangular stave church style in 1470 by an unknown architect.

The priest no longer lived in the parish after the year 1635, but regularly visited the island. Grip has been an annex to the Kristiansund church parish since 1967.

Located in a now-abandoned fishing village, the church is only used in the summer season, when both summer residents and tourists attend worship services every third Sunday, led by a priest from Kristiansund.

History
The church is a Møre type stave church, being structurally similar to the larger Kvernes and Rødven stave churches. In 1621, the church underwent major modifications when portions of the walls were rebuilt and a flèche was added.

In 1814, this church served as an election church. Together with more than 300 other parish churches across Norway, it was a polling station for elections to the 1814 Norwegian Constituent Assembly which wrote the Constitution of Norway. This was Norway's first national elections. Each church parish was a constituency that elected people called "electors" who later met together in each county to elect the representatives for the assembly that was to meet in Eidsvoll later that year.

New windows were installed in the 1870s, and at the same time both a weaponhouse and a sacristy were added. During restoration work in 1933 led by John Tverdahl, a new foundation was added and the exterior walls were panelled. Today, most of the walls and roof are still original to the stave church. A 1972 proposal to relocate the church did not materialize. In 2007, the roof and spire were restored and some of the paneling was replaced.

Interior

Altar
The altar is a triptych from Utrecht in the Netherlands, dated to about 1520, with a central sculpture of the Blessed Virgin Mary, flanked by sculptures of Saint Olaf of Norway and Saint Margaret the Virgin, locally known as St. Maret.

According to legend, the triptych is one of five altars donated to Norwegian churches by princess Isabella of Austria after being escorted by Erik Valkendorf, Archbishop of Norway, in terrible weather en route to her wedding in Copenhagen with the Danish king Christian II in 1515. Other altars were donated to the churches of Kinn, Leka, Hadsel and Røst. The five altars are referred to by art historians as the Leka group. Four of the altars have survived intact to this day, but Grip has the only complete altar in the original church.

Despite having sculptures of three saints, the altar survived the protestant reformation of Norway in 1537. The altar was restored in 2002.

Organ
A new pipe organ from the Netherlands with 270 wooden pipes was donated in 2006, which due to humid weather conditions will only be installed in the church during the summer season. The rest of the year, the organ is in use in Kirkelandet Church.

Art
The church also has a small altar cup from 1320, a 16th-century double-sided painting on canvas, murals from the 1621 modifications, and two votive ships.

Gallery

See also
 List of churches in Møre

References

Further reading

External links

 Grip stave church 
 The new organ 
 Image gallery from Grip stave church

Buildings and structures in Kristiansund
Churches in Møre og Romsdal
Stave churches in Norway
Wooden churches in Norway
15th-century churches in Norway
Churches completed in 1470
15th-century establishments in Norway
Norwegian election church